The Singleton House near Eatonton, Georgia was listed on the National Register of Historic Places in 1974.  It is located southwest of Eatonton, off Georgia Route 16.  More specifically, it is about seven miles west of Eatonton, then one mile south of the intersection of Highway 16 and Georgia Highway 142, on the right fork of a what was a dirt road in 1974.  In 2018, it may be located off what is now named McMillen Road, and may be the structure at exactly .

The house, which has also been known as the Singleton-McMillen House, was built around 1854.

It was deemed notable as "an outstanding cultural example of a modest, yet classically sophisticated plantation residence that was originally owned by prominent Putnam County citizens David and Rebecca Singleton."

References

Houses in Putnam County, Georgia
Houses on the National Register of Historic Places in Georgia (U.S. state)
Italianate architecture in Georgia (U.S. state)
Greek Revival architecture in Georgia (U.S. state)
Houses completed in 1854
National Register of Historic Places in Putnam County, Georgia